is a stand-alone masculine Japanese given name. Notable people with the name include:

, Japanese swordsman and member of the Shinsengumi
, a Gin Tama character

Japanese masculine given names